Malaysia has a number of national parks, but most of them are de facto state parks.

This page provides the list of protected areas and pictures associated with the facilities and activities available in each area.

Peninsular Malaysia
All parks and reserves in Peninsular Malaysia are under the jurisdiction of the Department of Wildlife and National Parks of Malaysia.

National parks
 Taman Negara, established 1939
 Endau-Rompin National Park, gazetted 1993
 Penang National Park, declared 2003
 Gunung Ledang National Park, gazetted 2005
 Taman Negara Johor Tanjung Piai
 Taman Negara Johor Pulau Kukup

State parks and reserves
Johor
 Hutan Lipur Sungai Bantang
 Hutan Lipur Gunung Arong
 Hutan Lipur Gunung Berlumut

Kelantan
 Gunung Stong State Park

Pahang
 Krau Wildlife Reserve

Perak
 Royal Belum State Park
 Sungkai Sambar Deer and Pheasant Wildlife Reserve

Perlis
 Perlis State Park
 Wang Pinang Reserve

Selangor
 Selangor State Park
 Sungai Dusun Wildlife Reserve
 Templer's Park
 Kuala Selangor Nature Park

Melaka
 Melaka State Park, Bukit Sedanan

 Terengganu
 Setiu Wetlands State Park
 Kenyir State Park

East Malaysia

Sarawak
National Parks and other conservation areas in Sarawak are under the governance of the Sarawak Forestry Corporation.

 Bako National Park
 Batang Ai National Park
 Bruit National Park
 Bukit Tiban National Park
 Gunung Buda National Park
 Gunung Gading National Park
 Gunung Mulu National Park
 Kubah National Park
 Kuching Wetlands National Park
 Lambir Hills National Park
 Limbang Mangrove National Park
 Loagan Bunut National Park
 Maludam National Park
 Miri-Sibuti Coral Reef National Park
 Niah National Park
 Pelagus National Park
 Pulong Tau National Park
 Rajang Mangroves National Park
 Samunsam Wildlife Sanctuary
 Santubong National Park
 Sedilu National Park
 Similajau National Park
 Sungai Meluang National Park
 Talang Satang National Park
 Tanjung Datu National Park
 Turtle Islands National Park
 Ulu Sebuyau National Park
 Usun Apau National Park
 Wind Cave Nature Reserve

Sabah
National or state parks in Sabah are managed by Sabah Parks. Other reserves or protected areas are under the governance of the Sabah Forestry Department and Sabah Foundation.
 Crocker Range Park
 Kinabalu Park
 Pulau Tiga Park
 Tawau Hills Park
 Tun Sakaran Marine Park
 Tunku Abdul Rahman Park
 Turtle Islands Park
 Sipadan Island Park
 Tun Mustapha Marine Park
 Kota Kinabalu Wetland Centre
 Lok Kawi Wildlife Park
 Padang Teratak Wetlands Area
 Lower Kinabatangan - Segama Wetlands
 Lower Kinabatangan Wildlife Sanctuary
 Tabin Wildlife Reserve
 Sepilok Orangutan Rehabilitation Centre

Protected Forest Reserves:
 Balembangan Forest Reserve
 Bengkoka Forest Reserve
 Bidu Bidu Forest Reserve
 Binsuluk Forest Reserve
 Botitian Forest Reserve
 Bukit Kuamas Forest Reserve
 Bukit Taviu Forest Reserve
 Danum Valley Conservation Area
 Deramakot Forest Reserve
 Gomantong Forest Reserve
 Gunung Rara Forest Reserve
 Klias Forest Reserve
 Lipaso Forest Reserve
 Maliau Basin Conservation Area
 Mandamai Forest Reserve
 Mount Pock Forest Reserve
 Silabukan Protection Forest Reserve
 Tawai Forest Reserve
 Tenompok Forest Reserve
 Ulu Kalumpang Forest Reserve
 Ulu Telupid Forest Reserve

See also
 Department of Wildlife and National Parks
 Protected areas of Johor
 Malaysian Wildlife Law
 Deforestation in Malaysia

References

External links

 Department of Wildlife and National Parks of Malaysia (PERHILITAN)
 Johor National Parks Corporation Website (JNPC)
 Travel Ideas for  National Park in Malaysia - Virtual Malaysia (Malaysia Social Travel Channel)

Malaysia
 
 
National parks